Grace Upshaw Tyler (born September 25, 1975) is an American track and field athlete who competes in the long jump. She represented the United States in her specialty at the Summer Olympics in both 2004 and 2008. She has also reached the long jump final at the World Championships in Athletics on two occasions (2003 and 2005). She was the bronze medallist in the long jump at the IAAF World Athletics Final in those years.

Grace Upshaw attended the University of California and while competing for the California Golden Bears she was the runner-up at the Pac-10 championships.

Her father, Monte Upshaw, broke the US scholastic long jump record held by Jesse Owens. Her older sister Joy Upshaw was elected into the USATF Masters Hall of Fame and holds several American masters records.

Achievements

References

External links
 

1975 births
Living people
American female long jumpers
Athletes (track and field) at the 2004 Summer Olympics
Athletes (track and field) at the 2008 Summer Olympics
California Golden Bears women's track and field athletes
Olympic track and field athletes of the United States
Sportspeople from Berkeley, California
Track and field athletes from California